Bryan M. E. MacMahon (born 10 April 1941) is a former judge of the Irish High Court and the author of textbooks on Irish law. He is the son of short story writer Bryan MacMahon, and a native of Listowel, County Kerry, Ireland.

Legal career
McMahon received his BCL and LLB degrees from University College of Dublin; subsequently, having been awarded the Harvard Fellowship, he undertook further postgraduate study at Harvard Law School. He returned to Ireland in 1967 to take up a post as a Statutory Lecturer in the Law Faculty, University College Cork (UCC). During his time at UCC Judge MacMahon went on to become Professor of Law and Head of the Department of Law. 

In 1987 McMahon joined the law firm of Houlihan and McMahon, Ennis, Co. Clare, as a senior partner. While continuing to practise law he simultaneously held a part-time Chair of Law at the NUI Galway. In 1999 he was appointed a judge of the Circuit Court. In 2007, he was promoted to the High Court in recognition of his status as a leading Irish jurist. A noted and oft cited jurist, he is deemed to be an authority on the bench in relation to tortious matters. 

He was appointed Adjunct Professor of the Faculty of Law at University College Cork in 2004. 

McMahon is also Chair of the Irish Universities Quality Board and the National Archives Advisory Council.

In 2005, McMahon (a lifelong theatre fan) was appointed Chairman of the Board of the Abbey Theatre by Minister for Arts, Sport and Tourism John O'Donoghue. The Abbey was the venue often used to showcase many plays written by McMahon's late father.

MacMahon lived in Kells, where he married Mary O'Neill, the sister of  a well renowned football club manager Martin O'Neill having managed teams such as Aston Villa.

He retired from the bench on 8 April 2011 having served for 12 years, 4 of which were as a judge of the High Court. He subsequently served as chairman of the Referendum Commission on Judges' pay which made recommendations to Government regarding the 29th Amendment to the Constitution.

Legal textbooks
MacMahon has co-authored many legal textbooks including:
Law of Torts, co-authored with William Binchy (Butterworths: 1980, 1989, 3rd Edition 2000);
Casebook on Irish Law of Torts, also co-authored with William Binchy, (Butterworths 1983, 2nd Edition 1991);
European Community Law in Ireland, co-authored with Finbarr Murphy (Butterworths: 1989).

References

1941 births
Living people
Harvard Law School alumni
High Court judges (Ireland)
People associated with the University of Galway
People from Listowel
Chairpersons of the Referendum Commission